Bromsgrove Road Cutting is a 0.2 hectare (0.5 acre) geological site of Special Scientific Interest in the West Midlands. The site was notified in 1990 under the Wildlife and Countryside Act 1981. It is located on the eastern edge of Halesowen.

See also
List of Sites of Special Scientific Interest in the West Midlands

References
 Bromsgrove Road Cutting citation sheet Natural England. Retrieved on 2008-05-28

Sites of Special Scientific Interest notified in 1990
Sites of Special Scientific Interest in the West Midlands (county)
Road cuttings in the United Kingdom
Roads in the West Midlands (county)
Geology of the West Midlands (county)
Halesowen